The Euphrates Syrian Pillar Figurines (EU_SPF's) are anthropomorphic clay figurines dating from the late Iron Age period (mid 8th-7th centuries BCE) and produced in the Middle Euphrates region. These figurines are part of a greater coroplastic production mainly composed of handmade horse-rider figurines, i.e. the Euphrates Handmade Syrian Horses and Riders (EU_HSHR's).

Other names in literature 
The actual nomenclature adopted for this class of figurines has been recently proposed in a doctoral research. Their current name recalls both their geographic origin and the shape of their bodies, which are hollow, tubular, and sometimes twice grooved at the base. However, one may find their appearance in literature with different nomenclatures:
 Baked Clay Handmade Freestanding Figurines or Syrian Terracottas – Free-standing handmodelled
 Nordyrische Pfeilerfigurinen (NPF)
 Standing or Pillar figurines

Technical characteristics

Modelling 
The clay figurines are completely handmade and free standing, in the fact, the name EU SPF's comes from their typical tubular bodies. The shape of the body is concave at the base to allow them to stand, the feet can be rendered through a central protruding piece of clay in the middle of the frontal part. They were usually held with one hand with the other one was engaged in modelling details. This was the so-called “snowman” technique, which allows working figurines in a three-dimensional space. The object is shaped all-around, preferring the under part of the figurine's body as base of support. Unlike figurines made with molds, these figurines could be viewed from all sides, although the front part is the preferred view. This characteristic can be appreciated by observing some headdresses, being well rendered in the front side, while to the back is not given special interest. Among the modelling tools apart from fingers one should mention a pointed wooden stick for the characterization of anatomical features, especially fingers, but also particular ornaments. Other more rarely used tools were floral patterns and combs.

Decorations and colours 
This production is characterized by abundant decorations directly applied on the figurine's body through strips and blobs of clay. Decorations are used to stress anatomical features - such as the eyes and the hairstyles - as well as fabric patterns of the attires or decorative items, like the jewellery. The fabric colours of the clay are quite uniform, suggesting that the figurines were all well-fired. A pale brown slip has been observed in surface, while it seems that these figurines were not painted.

Geographical spread 
EU_HSHR's figurines are attested only west of the Euphrates and in particular, the Euphrates band seems to be the main productive centre. From this area several specimens have been collected at Karkemish, Tell Ahmar, Tell Amarna, Deve Höyük, Tell Shiukh Fawqani, Saraga Höyük, and Zeytinli Bahçe Höyük. This production has been linked only to those sites with a strong Neo-Assyrian presence as a result of prolonged control of some urban-sized centres on the Euphrates. Indeed, these figurines do not appear in other nearby sites where the Neo-Assyrian invasion caused a socio-economic impoverishment. These are sites such as Tell Sheikh Hassan, Tell Qara Quzaq, Tell Qara Quyu Tahtani, and Tell Khamis. Outside the Euphrates’ catchment area, sporadic finds are spread towards West in sites like Zincirli Höyük, Tell Judaidah, Chatal Höyük, Tell Tayinat, Tell Abu Danne, and likely in Tell Rifaat and Neirab.

Chronology 
According to contextual data, these figurines are attested in some Middle Euphrates sites during the mature Iron Age. In archaeological contexts, such artefacts usually come from upper layers dating from the Neo-Assyrian period (7th century BCE), but the origin of this production may be identified at the end of Neo-Syrian period (mid/end-8th century BCE). Indeed, at the site of Karkemish the major part of finds belonged to Iron III layers, while a minor part was retrieved in Iron II ones.

Museums collections

See also
 Euphrates Handmade Syrian Horses and Riders
 Carchemish

Notes

References 
 Bolognani, B. 2017, The Iron Age Figurines from Karkemish (2011–2015 Campaigns) and the Coroplastic Art of the Syro-Anatolian Region, unpublished doctoral dissertation, University of Bologna, Bologna. Bolognani 2017_thesis
 Bolognani, B. 2020a, "The Iron Age Female Figurines from Karkemish and the Middle Euphrates Valley. Preliminary Notes on Some Syrian Pillar Figurines", in Donnat S., Hunziker-Rodewald R., Weygand I. (eds), Figurines féminines nues : Proche-Orient, Égypte, Nubie, Méditerranée, Asie centrale (VIIIe millénaire av. J.-C.  - IVe siècle ap. J.-C.), Proceedings of the International Conference “Figurines féminines nues. Proche-Orient, Egypte, Nubie, Méditerranée, Asie centrale”, June 25th-26th 2015, MISHA, Strasbourg, Études d’archéologie et d’histoire ancienne (EAHA), De Boccard, Paris, pp. 209–223.Bolognani 2020a
 Bolognani, B. 2020b, "Figurines as Social Markers: The Neo-Assyrian Impact on the Northern Levant as Seen from the Material Culture", in Gavagnin K., Palermo R. (eds), Imperial Connections. Interactions and Expansions from Assyria to the Roman Period. Proceedings of the 5th “Broadening Horizons” Conference, 5–8 June 2017, Udine(West & East Monografie 2), University of Udine, Udine, pp. 43–57.Bolognani 2020b 
 Clayton, V. 2001, Visible Bodies, Resistant Slaves: Towards an Archaeology of the Other: The 7th Century Figurines from Tell Ahmar, unpublished doctoral dissertation, University of Melbourne, School of Fine Arts, Classical Studies and Archaeology, Melbourne.
 Clayton, V. 2013, Figurines, Slaves and Soldiers. The Iron Age Figurines from the Euphrates Valley, North Syria, K&H Publishing, Victoria.
 Moorey P.R.S. 1980, Cemeteries of the First Millenium B.C. at Deve Huyuk, near Carchemish. Salvaged by T.E. Lawrence and C.L. Woolley in 1913 (with a catalogue raisonne of the objects in Berlin, Cambridge, Liverpool, London and Oxford)(«BAR» 87), Bar Publishing, Oxford.
 Moorey P.R.S. 2005, Ancient Near Eastern Terracottas: With a Catalogue of the Collection in the Ashmolean Museum, Ashmolean Museum, Oxford.
 Ohata, K. (ed.) 1967. Tel Zeror II. Preliminary Report of the Excavation, Second Season 1965, The Society for Near Eastern Studies in Japan, Tokyo.
 Pruss A. 2010, Die Amuq-Terrakotten. Untersuchungen zu den Terrakotta-Figuren des 2. und 1. Jahrtausends v.Chr. aus dem Grabungen des Oriental Institute Chicago in der Amuq-Ebene,(Subartu 26), Brepols, Turnhout.
 Schlossman, B.L. 1981, "183. Female Figurine", "224. Female Figurine", in O.W. Muscarella (ed.), Ladders to Heaven : Art Treasures from Lands of the Bible : a Catalogue of some of the Objects in the Collection Presented by Elie Borowski to the Lands of the Bible Archaeology Foundation and Displayed in the exhibition "Ladders to Heaven : Our Judeo-Christian Heritage 5000 BC-AD 500", Royal Ontario Museum, June 23 – October 28, 1979, The Bible Lands Museum, Jerusalem, pp. 222–223,261.
Spycket, A. 2000, The Human Form Divine: From the Collections of Elie Borowski, Bible Lands Museum, Jerusalem.
 Zemer, A. 2009, Terracotta Figurines in Ancient Time, The National Maritime Museum, Haifa Museums, Haifa.

Iron Age art
Hittite art
Carchemish
Terracotta sculptures
Syro-Hittite states
Archaeology of Syria
Archaeology of Turkey
Ancient Near East art and architecture
Assyrian art and architecture
Figurines